Neoevolutionism as a social theory attempts to explain the evolution of societies by drawing on Charles Darwin's theory of evolution while discarding some dogmas of the previous theories of social evolutionism. Neoevolutionism is concerned with long-term,
evolutionary social change and with the regular patterns of development that may be seen in unrelated, widely separated cultures.

See also

 Cliodynamics
 Critical juncture theory
 Dual inheritance theory
 Sociobiology
 State formation
 Technological singularity
 World-systems theory

References

Anthropology
Sociocultural evolution theory